Bombay Begums is an Indian drama streaming television series for Netflix created by Alankrita Shrivastava, who also co-wrote the script along with Bornila Chatterjee and Iti Agarwal. The series directed by Shrivastava and Chatterjee, is produced by the Los Angeles-based Chernin Entertainment and Endemol Shine Group, which features Pooja Bhatt, Shahana Goswami, Amruta Subhash and Plabita Borthakur in the lead roles, which was narrated by Aadhya Anand. The series marks the comeback of actress Pooja Bhatt. It explores the lives of five ambitious women from various walks of life navigating through their dreams, desires and disappointments, from boardrooms to society's margins, in modern-day Mumbai. It was released on Netflix on 8 March 2021.

Plot 
Set in contemporary urban India, five women, across generations, wrestle with desire, ethics, personal crises and vulnerabilities to own their ambition. Rani is the CEO of a bank who takes great effort in hiding the bank's problems. Fatima, who works under Rani, does everything possible to please her husband. Lily, who lives in a chawl, has previously been a bar dancer and is now scamming her way to a better life for herself and her son. Ayesha is bisexual and is from a small town (Indore) and is new to the city of Mumbai. The series explores drug abuse, blackmail, broken dreams, and aspirations of these characters.

Cast 
 Pooja Bhatt as Rani Irani, CEO of Royal Bank of Bombay
 Shahana Goswami as Fatima Warsi
 Amruta Subhash as Lily
 Plabita Borthakur as Ayesha
 Aadhya Anand as Shai
 Manish Choudhary as Deepak Sanghvi
 Sanghmitra Hitaishi as Chithra Parasarthy
 Rahul Bose as Mahesh Rao
 Imaad Shah as Ron
 Vivek Gomber as Arijai, Fatima's husband
 Danish Husain as Naushad Irani, Rani's husband
 Nauheed Cyrusi as Piya
 Vivek Tandon as Cyrus Dastur
 Deepak Soni as Raj Parkar

Episodes

Production

Origin 
Alankrita Shrivastava recalled in an interview that she had watched the 1991 film Dil Hai Ke Manta Nahin directed by Mahesh Bhatt, which saw his daughter Pooja Bhatt's acting into fruition, at least 21 times. She insisted to make a new project with Bhatt in the leading role. Titled Bombay Begums, Bhatt initially disagreed to accept the script although she liked the synopsis narrated by Shrivastava, but later changed her decision and gave her nod to the script. The series marked Pooja Bhatt's comeback in acting career after she made a cameo appearance in Sadak 2 (2020).

Development 
The inspiration for Bombay Begums was originated long back in 2012, when she found herself wondering about the double lives of urban Indian women who join the corporate workforce and excel at their jobs but still have to confront gendered expectations back at home, citing the examples of her past life. She initially conceived Bombay Begums as a television show and started writing the script, but she could not find the right producers for the series. Post the release of Lipstick Under My Burkha in 2017, the Los Angeles-based Chernin Entertainment expressed interest in Bombay Begums and Netflix came on board soon after. Like her previous outings Lipstick Under My Burkha and Dolly Kitty Aur Woh Chamakte Sitare, Bombay Begums revolves around women who are in a state of transition – personal and professional – examining the illusion of freedom afforded to them in modern India.

Filming 
Shrivastava started the creation of the series while working on the Prime original Made In Heaven. She and her co-team members Iti Agarwal and Bornila Chatterjee, worked on the writing and direction of the series. The principal shooting of the series took place in late 2019 and was completed in March 2020, weeks prior to the COVID-19 pandemic lockdown in India. The team undertook post-production activities in July 2020 and was completed within two months.

Soundtrack 

The soundtrack album of Bombay Begums featured seven songs composed by Tarana Marwah, one song by Chetan Dominic Awasthi and four songs by Anand Bhaskar. Gaurav Raina of the electronic group MIDIval Punditz mixed and mastered the soundtrack and also performed the theme music of the series. Raina also composed and written the song along with Tarana Marwah, who worked in the Amazon Prime Video series Made In Heaven. The album was released through YouTube on 14 March 2021.

Release 
Even before the announcement of the Netflix original slate on 3 March 2021, the team released the first poster of the series on 10 February 2021. On 18 February 2021, the official trailer of the series was unveiled through YouTube. The series was unveiled on 8 March 2021 through Netflix, which coincided the occasion of International Women's Day.

Reception

Critical response 
The series opened to mixed response from critics. Sayan Ghosh of The Hindu stated "Director Alankrita Shrivastava’s ability to navigate through various layers of suppressed anger and the emotional volatility of her characters make for a most engaging watch". Shubhra Gupta of The Indian Express stated "The most powerful element in Alankrita Srivastava’s films is the recognition of women’s desire, and how its absence can create permanent hollowness." Saibal Chatterjee of NDTV gave three-and-a-half out of five to the series and reviewed "Bombay Begums, created by Alankrita Shrivastava (Lipstick Under My Burkha), who shares screenwriting and directorial responsibilities with Bornila Chatterjee (The Hungry), strikes an instant chord because it strings together relatable, rooted stories."

Saraswati Datar of The News Minute gave a review "Bombay Begums is an entertaining watch, but don’t expect to feel moved or empowered after watching it." Rohan Naahar of Hindustan Times stated "Terrific performances by Pooja Bhatt, Amruta Subhash, Plabita Borthakur, Shahana Goswami and Manish Chaudhary smooth out the creases." Swetha Ramakrishnan of Firstpost gave three-and-a-half out of five, reviewing, "With crisp episodes (even though clocking in at 50 minutes each), the series is fairly easy to sit through despite its imperfections." Saibal Chatterjee of NDTV wrote: Netflix Series Rides On Top-Notch Performances, Not Least By Pooja Bhatt.

Government censorship
India's National Commission for Protection of Child Rights sent notice to Netflix to stop streaming the series in March 2021. The notice quoted complaints from two Twitter users over content portraying the drug use of minors and themes of sexuality, saying it would "not only pollute the young minds of the children, and may also result in the abuse and the exploitation of children". The commission called on Netflix to "take extra precaution while streaming any content in respect of the children or for the children and shall also refrain themselves from getting into such things".

Awards and nominations

See also
Cuties, 2020 film with a similar controversy

References

External links 
 
 
Bombay Begums at Netflix

Indian television series distributed by Netflix
Indian drama web series
Hindi-language web series
Hindi-language Netflix original programming
Obscenity controversies in television
Television shows set in Mumbai
2021 web series debuts